The 1971 Lafayette Leopards football team was an American football team that represented Lafayette College as an independent during the 1971 NCAA College Division football season.

In their first year under head coach Neil Putnam, the Leopards compiled a 5–5 record. Peter Tonks and Edward DiSalvo were the team captains.

Lafayette played its home games at Fisher Field on College Hill in Easton, Pennsylvania.

Schedule

References

Lafayette
Lafayette Leopards football seasons
Lafayette Leopards football